Kristian Prestrud (22 October 1881 – 11 November 1927) was a Norwegian naval officer and polar explorer who participated in Amundsen's South Pole expedition between 1910 and 1912. Prestrud was first officer of the Fram and leader of the Norwegian expedition's Eastern Sledge Party to the Scott Nunataks.

Background
Kristian Prestrud was born in the parish of Grue in Hedmark, Norway and was baptized in Grue Church  during January 1882. His father was a distillery manager in Løten. Krsitian Prestrud left for the sea in 1896. He entered at the Naval Academy at Karljohansvern in Horten during 1898. He became second lieutenant in 1902 and first lieutenant in 1905. After leaving the Academy he sailed in the merchant fleet.

Amundsen's South Pole expedition
Roald Amundsen was secretive about his real attentions with regards of the Fram expeditions, the only persons to know in advance were his brother, and the ship's commander, Lieutenant Thorvald Nilsen. Lieutenant Prestrud and one other of the crew, Hjalmar Fredrik Gjertsen (1885-1958), were trusted with the information on the eve of the Fram's departure from Norway. The rest of the crew of 18 was only to know upon Fram's stop-over at Madeira. During the winter stay at Framheim in Antarctica Prestrud, assisted by Hjalmar Johansen, made scientific observations.

Prestrud was assigned to the original group of eight men that made the unsuccessful attempt to reach the Pole on 8 September 1911. Although they were forced to retreat due to extreme temperatures, they decided to head for the depot at 80°, unload their sledges and race back to Framheim. The disordered return was made in scattered groups, with the last two men arriving more than six hours after the others. Johansen and Prestrud stumbled into Framheim totally exhausted, having found the camp in the dark and fog only by following the barking of the dogs. It is likely that Prestrud would have frozen to death if Johansen had not taken care of him and brought him to safety.

The next morning Amundsen was heavily criticised by Johansen, who had experience from his Arctic exploration with Fridtjof Nansen. Such opposition was unheard-of and Amundsen then reorganized the Pole party by reducing its number. Consequently, Johansen, together with Prestrud and Stubberud was separated from the Pole team and tasked with the exploration of King Edward VII Land. In order to dishonor Johansen further, the less experienced Prestrud was put in charge of this. A cairn erected by Prestrud's group at Scott Nunataks, Alexandra Mountains on 3 December 1911 is considered a historic site of Antarctica.

Awards
For his participation in the expedition, Kristian Prestrud was awarded the South Pole Medal (Sydpolsmedaljen), a  Royal Norwegian award instituted by  King Haakon VII in 1912 to reward participants in Roald Amundsen's South Pole expedition. In 1926, Prestrud was appointed assistant port of Kristiansand, but died the following year in 1927 at Kristiansand, Norway .

See also
Mount Prestrud
Prestrud Inlet

Sources
Roald Amundsen wrote about the expedition in Sydpolen published in two volumes in 1912-1913.
The work was translated into English by A. G. Chater, and published as The South Pole: An Account of the Norwegian Antarctic Expedition in the "Fram," 1910-1912

References

External links
Fram Museum official website

1880s births
1927 suicides
People from Grue, Norway
Royal Norwegian Navy personnel
Explorers of Antarctica
Marie Byrd Land explorers and scientists
Norwegian polar explorers
Norwegian military personnel who committed suicide
Suicides by firearm in Norway
Amundsen's South Pole expedition